Cherry Grove Township is a civil township of Wexford County in the U.S. state of Michigan.  The population was 2,377 at the 2010 census.

Communities
A post office in Axin operated from  August 21, 1899 until January 30, 1943.
It is located about one mile south of M-55, five miles west of Cadillac. The community was named after local farmer Swan Benson and once contained its own post office from November 17, 1884 until April 30, 1911.
Cherry Grove was one of the original communities within the township when a rural post office was established.  The post office was very short lived and operated only from February 7 to March 3, 1879.

Geography

Portions of Lake Mitchell are within the township in the northeast corner.

Major highways
 runs east–west through the northern portion of the township.
 runs very briefly through the northeast corner of the township.

Demographics
As of the census of 2000, there were 2,328 people, 908 households, and 714 families residing in the township. The racial makeup of the township was 97.98% White, 0.09% African American, 0.39% Native American, 0.60% Asian, and 0.95% from two or more races. Hispanic or Latino of any race were 0.69% of the population.

There were 908 households, out of which 32.4% had children under the age of 18 living with them, 70.9% were married couples living together, 4.7% had a female householder with no husband present, and 21.3% were non-families. 18.3% of all households were made up of individuals, and 5.4% had someone living alone who was 65 years of age or older.  The average household size was 2.56 and the average family size was 2.89.

In the township the population was spread out, with 24.7% under the age of 18, 5.1% from 18 to 24, 26.6% from 25 to 44, 30.5% from 45 to 64, and 13.0% who were 65 years of age or older.  The median age was 42 years. For every 100 females, there were 98.3 males.  For every 100 females age 18 and over, there were 100.0 males.

The median income for a household in the township was $51,190, and the median income for a family was $55,444. Males had a median income of $39,688 versus $25,781 for females. The per capita income for the township was $22,798.  About 5.3% of families and 5.9% of the population were below the poverty line, including 4.0% of those under age 18 and 1.8% of those age 65 or over.

Education
Cherry Grove Township is served by two separate public school districts.  The vast majority of the township is served by Cadillac Area Public Schools to the east in the city of Cadillac.  A very small portion of the southeast corner of the township is served by Pine River Area Schools to the south in the village of LeRoy in Osceola County.

References

Sources

Townships in Michigan
Townships in Wexford County, Michigan